Rapid transit in the United Kingdom consists of four systems in three cities: the London Underground and Docklands Light Railway in London, Tyne and Wear Metro in Newcastle upon Tyne, and the Glasgow Subway. The term also includes commuter rail systems with aspects of rapid transit such as the London Overground and Crossrail in London, and Merseyrail in the Liverpool City Region. Rapid transit has also been proposed in other UK cities including Sheffield,  Manchester, Leeds, Birmingham, Cardiff, Bristol, and Cambridge.

History

The United Kingdom is the birthplace of rapid transit, with London and Liverpool hosting the world's first and second urban rail transit and Glasgow the fourth. From 1893 to 1956 the Liverpool Overhead Railway was the only elevated rapid transit in the country, however fell into disuse being demolished in 1957. In the 20th and 21st century the United Kingdom has chosen to not prioritise investment in rapid transit schemes; instead cities like Manchester, Sheffield, and Edinburgh have opted for trams.

List of systems

The following are usually referred to as commuter rail systems, but possess aspects of rapid transit:

Defunct systems
 Liverpool Overhead Railway

Cancelled systems
 Picc-Vic tunnel

Proposed systems
 Bristol Underground
 Cambridge Metro
 Crossrail 2
 Glasgow Metro (light rail)
 North and West London Light Railway
 South Hampshire Rapid Transit
 Taunton metro rail
 West London Orbital
 HERT (Hertfordshire and Essex Rapid Transit)

See also
 Urban rail in the United Kingdom
 List of modern tramway and light rail systems in the United Kingdom
 List of guided busways and BRT systems in the United Kingdom

Notes

References